Jimmy Giuffre (also released as Four Brothers) is the debut album by American jazz clarinet and saxophone player, composer and arranger Jimmy Giuffre. It was released on the Capitol label initially in 10-inch LP format in 1954 with seven tracks, and an expanded 12-inch LP version with 10 tracks was released in 1955.

Reception

Scott Yanow of Allmusic stated, "The leader wrote eight of the ten songs (including a remake of his biggest hit 'Four Brothers'), several of which show off his growing interest in both folk and classical musics. Fine performances, but this album will be difficult to find".

Track listing 
All compositions by Jimmy Giuffre except as indicated
 "Four Brothers" - 3:12
 "Someone to Watch Over Me" (George Gershwin, Ira Gershwin) - 3:07
 "Sultana" - 2:50
 "A Ring-Tail Monkey" - 2:32
 "Nutty Pine" - 3:10
 "Wrought of Iron" - 2:47
 "Do It" - 3:14
 "All for You" - 2:46
 "Iranic" - 4:46
 "I Only Have Eyes for You" (Harry Warren, Al Dubin) - 6:13
Recorded at Capitol Studios in Los Angeles, CA on February 19, 1954 (tracks 7, 8 & 10), April 15, 1954 (tracks 1, 3, 5 & 6) and January 31, 1955 (tracks 2, 4 & 9)

Personnel 
Jimmy Giuffre - clarinet, tenor saxophone, baritone saxophone
Bud Shank - alto saxophone (tracks 1, 3, 5 & 6)
Jack Sheldon - trumpet
Shorty Rogers - flugelhorn (tracks 1, 3, 5 & 6)
Bob Enevoldsen - valve trombone, bass (tracks 1, 3, 5 & 6)
Russ Freeman - piano (tracks 7, 8 & 10)
Curtis Counce (tracks 7, 8 & 10), Ralph Peña (tracks 1-6 & 9) - bass
Artie Anton (tracks 2, 4 & 9), Shelly Manne (tracks 1, 3, 5-8 & 10) - drums

References 

Jimmy Giuffre albums
1955 albums
Capitol Records albums